The King Plow Arts Center is a commercial, performing, and visual arts center located on Marietta Street in the Marietta Street Artery district of West Midtown, Atlanta. King Plow is the largest center of its kind in the city. King Plow is also a popular music venue for concerts and live music shows in Atlanta.

History

Prior to the construction of the current building in 1902, the Walker-Sims Plow Company operated in buildings on the current site. In that year, Clyde Lanier King and two partners bought the company and renamed it the Atlanta Agricultural Works, in 1906 again to the Atlanta Plow Company and in 1928 to the King Plow Company. At its zenith the plant employed 300. Sales eventually declined and the factory closed in 1986. In 1990, the owners decided to redevelop the factory into a mixed use arts facility using the historic buildings and provide affordable studios for artists and other creative businesses and individuals.

The project started with 11 separate buildings. The buildings were built at different periods of time throughout the King Plow Company's existence.

Terminal West
Terminal West, a 7,000-square foot music venue, is located within the King Plow Arts Center.  The venue, which includes an outdoor roof deck overlooking historic train tracks, specializes in electronic musical acts, particularly dub step. The venue won a 2012 "Best New Venue" award. As noted in their Creative Loafing award and in Atlanta Magazine's initial write-up, Terminal West has grown to hold shows representing many different genres.

In early 2013, Terminal West expanded to hold a restaurant titled Stationside that serves lunch Tuesday - Friday and along with dinner any night of a show.

References

External links
 
 King Plow concerts and live shows

Arts centers in Georgia (U.S. state)
Performing arts centers in Georgia (U.S. state)
Theatres in Atlanta
Concert halls in the United States
Music venues in Georgia (U.S. state)
Industrial landmarks in Atlanta
Industrial buildings completed in 1902
Adaptive reuse of industrial structures in Atlanta
English Avenue and Vine City